Dietrichson is a surname. Notable people with the surname include:

Espen Dietrichson (born 1976), Norwegian artist
Gustav Dietrichson (1855–1922), Norwegian theologian and bishop
Jan W. Dietrichson (born 1927), Norwegian philologist
Johannes Wilhelm Christian Dietrichson (1815–1883), Norwegian Lutheran minister
Lorentz Dietrichson (1834–1917), Norwegian poet and historian of art and literature
Oluf Christian Dietrichson (1856–1942), Norwegian explorer and military officer
Phyllis Dietrichson, fictional character in the two film adaptations of James M. Cain's novella Double Indemnity

See also
Dietrich